An Innocent Kiss (formerly titled Elbow Grease) is a 2016 American comedy-drama film written and directed by Jason Shirley and starring Burt Reynolds.

Plot

Cast
Burt Reynolds as Grandpa
Michael Abbott Jr. as Randy Barnes
R. Keith Harris as Billy Barnes
Whitney Goin as Ellie Barnes

Production
The film was shot in 30 days in Seneca, South Carolina in 2013.

Release
The film had a "soft release" in 2016.  It also had a one-night premiere in Seneca in October 2018.

Reception
The Dove Foundation gave the film a negative review, calling it "a little too ripe."

References

External links
 
 

Films shot in South Carolina